Shireshead is a hamlet near Forton, Lancashire. It includes an Anglican church, St James', which was designed by the Leeds-based architectural firm Kelly & Birchall and built in 1887–90.

References

Hamlets in Lancashire
Geography of the Borough of Wyre